Bonchari is an electoral constituency in Kisii County. It is one of nine constituencies in the county. The constituency was established for the 1988 elections.
It has four wards namely;
Riana, Bomorenda, Bomariba and Bogiakumu.

Members of Parliament

Wards 
Bonchari Constituency has four wards represented by Members of county assembly in the Kisii County government. The wards are: Bogiakumu, Bomariba, Bokeira (Bomorenda) and Riana.

Kisii South Sub-county
Kisii South Sub-county shares common boundaries with Bonchari. The Sub-county is headed by the sub-county administrator, appointed by a County Public Service Board.

References 

Constituencies in Kisii County
Constituencies in Nyanza Province
1988 establishments in Kenya
Constituencies established in 1988